Liceo Fermín del Real Castillo is a Chilean high school located in Chépica, Colchagua Province, Chile.

References 

Educational institutions established in 1982
1982 establishments in Chile
Secondary schools in Chile
Schools in Colchagua Province